Madagasikara spinosa is a species of tropical freshwater snail with a gill and an operculum, an aquatic gastropod mollusc in the family Pachychilidae.

Madagasikara spinosa is the type species of the genus Madagasikara.

Distribution 
This species is endemic to Madagascar. It was recorded in East Madagascar and in surrounding islands such as Île Sainte-Marie.

The type locality is "Dans le rivières de l’ile de Madagascar", in rivers of Madagascar.

Description 

The shell is elongate and large and it has 5.0-11.0 whorls. The color of the shell is from brown to black. The apex is truncated. There are axial ribs especially on upper whorls. The aperture is widely oval with palatal and basal sinus.

The width of the shell is 9.9-28.3 mm. The height of the shell is 25.2-69.5 mm. The width of the aperture is 5.0-18.4 mm. The height of the aperture is 8.0-23.1 mm.

The operculum is oval and black.

The color of the animal is dark grey to black with yellowish dots. Tentacles are quite long. Radula is taeniglossate. Radula is about 16 mm long with about 127 rows of teeth.

Ecology 
It lives in fast running streams.

Sexes are separate (gonochorism). Females lays eggs (oviparous).

References

Pachychilidae
Gastropods described in 1822
Taxonomy articles created by Polbot
Endemic fauna of Madagascar